Mianbar may refer to:

Mianbar, Gilan
Mianbar, Qazvin